The Vice Chief of the Defence Staff (VCDS) is the second most senior member of the Canadian Armed Forces, reporting to the Chief of the Defence Staff (CDS) as well as the Deputy Minister of National Defence. The Directorate General Executive Coordination, the Canadian Forces Provost Marshal, the National Cadet and Junior Canadian Rangers Support Group and several other departments report to the VCDS, who is appointed by the CDS.

Recent history
Vice-Admiral Mark Norman was temporarily relieved as VCDS on January 13, 2017, due to an ongoing investigation by the Royal Canadian Mounted Police. As a temporary replacement, Vice-Admiral Ron Lloyd was appointed the duties of VCDS on an acting basis, and he was subsequently replaced by Lieutenant-General Alain Parent on May 30, 2017.

On July 16, 2018, Lieutenant-General Paul Wynnyk was named Vice Chief of the Defence Staff. On July 9, 2019, Wynnyk announced his retirement after he claimed that the Chief of the Defence Staff, General Jonathan Vance, planned to replace him as Vice Chief of the Defence Staff with Vice-Admiral Mark Norman. Wynnyk then alleged that these plans were reversed when Vice-Admiral Norman settled with the government and retired from the military. Wynnyk was the fifth Vice Chief to serve under Vance.

On July 12, 2019, Lieutenant-General Jean-Marc Lanthier was appointed Vice Chief of the Defence Staff, effective July 18, 2019. On March 16, 2020, it was announced that Lanthier was retiring in the summer, to be replaced by Lieutenant-General Michael Rouleau. 

In March 2021, it was announced that Rouleau would be succeeded by Lieutenant-General Frances J. Allen, the first woman to hold the position. On June 28, 2021, she formally assumed the role of VCDS in a ceremony at National Defence Headquarters.

Vice Chiefs of the Defence Staff

References

External links
 

 
Canadian Armed Forces
Canadian military personnel
Military appointments of Canada
Canada